World of Sand is the third album by Servant, released in 1982 on Rooftop Records.
World of Sand was the debut album for Rooftop Records, the new media arm of the Highway Missionary Society (the band's parent organization). The title comes from a line in the last song:Stylistically, this album would mark the beginning of a move away from the blues rock/classic rock style of their first two albums, toward the synth-infused new wave styles that would mark their latter works.

Background 

The process of creating this album was tragically overshadowed by a devastating accident the summer before:

In the aftermath of their loss, the band members were able to find some catharsis  by channeling their grief into the creation of the 8-minute epic, "Sudden Death". The song begins with the optimism of a new day, then suddenly changes with the confusion and anguish over the accident, closing with acknowledgement of God's power over the situation, quoting  ("O death, where is thy sting?"). Most of the band members contributed to the writing of the song, as well as members of the community, including Susan Palosaari, who lost her son that day.

After the intensity of dealing with "Sudden Death", the album closes with the altar call "Come Jesus Come", in which they proclaim their readiness to re-dedicate themselves even after dealing with such tragedy.

Critical reception 

Upon the reissue on CD, Mike Rimmer of Cross Rhythms said "25 years after it was released, these songs still feel relevant, and it made me wonder why on today's scene there aren't more bands like Servant who used their music to say something spiritually challenging?"

World of Sand was also recognized on the blog "CCM's 500 Best Albums of All Time" at No. 337.

Artwork, packaging 

The illustration that graces the front cover is by Orange County artist Kerne Erickson, whose work can also be seen on albums by Sweet Comfort Band (their album Cutting Edge, released the same year, was a good example of their albums featuring cover art by Erickson). The illustration shows a horse and rider galloping away from a city made of sand, about to be washed away to the sea by a large wave of water.

Reissues 
After the initial pressing, Rooftop reissued the album in 1983 without the bonus 7" record, but adding the first track ("Cog in the Wheel") to the end of side one.

In 2006, World of Sand was remastered and given its first CD release by Retroactive Records.

Track listing

Personnel

Servant 

 Owen Brock – rhythm guitar, background vocals
 Sandie Brock – lead & background vocals
 Bob Hardy – lead & background vocals
 David Holmes – drums, background vocals
 Rob Martens – bass guitar, background vocals
 Matt Spransy – keyboards
 Bruce Wright – lead guitar

Production 

 Produced by Servant and Jim Palosaari with
 Production help – Jonathan David Brown
 Engineered by Jonathan David Brown and Thom Roy
 Assistant engineer – John Jenkinson
 Recorded at Whitefield Studio, Santa Ana, California
 Mixed by Jonathan David Brown
 Mastered by Steve Hall at MCA Recording Studios, Glendale, California
 Album cover painting – Kearney [sic] Erickson
 Art direction, design & graphics – Owen Brock and Jenny Haas
 Desert photographs by Pete and Flo Hicks

Reissue 

 Remastered by Rev at Creation Station Media

Notes

References

External links 
 
 

1982 albums
Servant (band) albums